Paulo Roberto da Silva Zaltron born July 6, 1980 in Cruz Alta, Rio Grande do Sul) is a Brazilian football striker.

Club career
He moved to Mes in 2007 where the club was promoted to Persian Gulf Cup and was a regular player for the team in his first season but in his second season he almost lost his spot after the entrance of his Brazilian teammates but still scored number of goals.

Club career statistics 

 Assist Goals

External links

1980 births
Living people
Brazilian footballers
Grêmio Foot-Ball Porto Alegrense players
Clube Atlético Bragantino players
Londrina Esporte Clube players
Guaratinguetá Futebol players
União Agrícola Barbarense Futebol Clube players
Ituano FC players
Associação Chapecoense de Futebol players
Sertãozinho Futebol Clube players
Avaí FC players
Sanat Mes Kerman F.C. players
Persian Gulf Pro League players
Brazilian expatriate footballers
Expatriate footballers in Iran
Sportspeople from Rio Grande do Sul
Association football forwards